Gloria Frym is an American poet, fiction writer, and essayist.



Biography
Gloria Frym was born in Brooklyn, New York and grew up in Los Angeles. She also lived in New Mexico for many years. She earned her MA and BA degrees at the University of New Mexico where she studied with the poet Robert Creeley.

In the 1980s, she taught creative writing at San Francisco State University, as well as the San Francisco county jails. During this time, she became interested in elements of language poetry and other theory-based poetics and began writing prose poems, developing into the prose narrative. From 1987 to 2002, she was core faculty in the poetics program at the New College of California in San Francisco, founded for the poet Robert Duncan.

Frym is frequently guest faculty in the Summer Writing Program at Naropa University in Boulder, Colorado. She has served as Distinguished Writer in Residence at St. Mary's College in Moraga, California and Visiting Professor of Creative Writing at the University of New Mexico. She has guest lectured at Evergreen State College; The Woodland Pattern Book Center, Milwaukee; Western Connecticut State University; Scripps College; the American Embassy Cultural Centers, Nagoya and Kyoto, Japan; New Langton Arts and Intersection in San Francisco; and The Chautauqua Institution in New York.

She is currently Professor in the MFA and BA Writing & Literature Programs at California College of the Arts in the San Francisco Bay Area.

Awards and honors 
Frym's book Homeless at Home won a 2002 American Book Award. Her other honors include the San Francisco State University Poetry Center Book Award, grants from the California Arts Council and The Walter and Elise Haas Creative Work Fund, and two awards from the Fund for Poetry.

Selected publications
How Proust Ruined My Life & Other Essays, BlazeVOX Books, 2020
The True Patriot, Spuyten Duyvil, 2015
The Stage Stop Motel, Spuyten Duyvil, 2014
Mind Over Matter, BlazeVOX Books, 2011
Any Time Soon, Little Red Leaves, 2010
The Lost Sappho Poems, Effing Press, 2007
Solution Simulacra, United Artists, 2006
Homeless at Home, Creative Arts Book Company, 2001
Distance No Object, City Lights Books, 1999
How I Learned, Coffee House Press, 1992
By Ear, Sun and Moon Press, 1991
Three Counts, San Francisco Arts Commission, 1988
Back to Forth, The Figures, 1982
Second Stories: Interviews with Women Artists, Chronicle Books, 1979
Impossible Affection, Christopher's Books, 1979

References

External links
 Poetry Foundation review of The Lost Sappho Poems
 Jacket Magazine review of Solution Simulacra
 Publishers Weekly review of How I Learned
 Rain Taxi review of Mind Over Matter
 American Book review of The True Patriot 
 Featherboard Writing Series review 
 Interview with Rebecca Samuelson, The Write Stuff Series 

California College of the Arts faculty
1947 births
Living people
American fiction writers
American women poets
American essayists
University of New Mexico alumni
San Francisco State University faculty
American women essayists
American Book Award winners
American women academics
21st-century American women